Boom Blox Bash Party, called Boom Blox Smash Party in non-English territories, is a physics-based puzzle video game developed by EA Los Angeles and published by Electronic Arts for the Wii video game console. It is a sequel to Boom Blox, and was released on 19 May 2009 in North America and in Europe on 29 May 2009. The game features more than 400 levels, and players are able to download new levels and upload their own custom-created levels to share online. Its development began after the completion of its predecessor, and it was formally announced on 28 January 2009. As with the original game, it was designed by film director Steven Spielberg.

The gameplay of Boom Blox Bash Party resembles the original's, but features new mechanics. It has less emphasis on the shooting mode, which the developers commented was their least favorite mode of play in Boom Blox. It was created as part of a deal between Electronic Arts and Steven Spielberg to make three original properties, though it does not count as one of the three original properties. As of April 2012, EA has shut down the online servers, meaning players can no longer upload and download user created games.

Gameplay

Boom Blox Bash Party features similar gameplay to its predecessor. It features a new slingshot mechanic; the shooting mechanic is less prominent than in the first game. The game includes new environments (such as underwater and outer space), new block shapes (such as cylinders and ramps), and more extensive multiplayer.

Boom Blox Bash Party originally allowed players to upload levels, as well as download levels made by other players and Electronic Arts. Uploaded levels had to be reviewed by Electronic Arts, with any inappropriate content filtered out. However, a player could download any levels made by someone on their Wii Friends list. Boom Blox Bash Party did not feature Friend Codes, a common method of online play in Wii and Nintendo DS games. Some of the levels uploaded by EA include levels from the original Boom Blox. The ability to upload and download levels ended on April 13, 2012 when EA shut down all of the servers.

Development
Bash Partys development was announced on 18 November 2008 by Variety. It was announced for a Spring 2009 release as Boom Blox Bash Party on January 28, 2009 by EA Casual. The game was developed by Electronic Arts and Steven Spielberg, just like its predecessor. It was a part of a 2005 deal between EA and Spielberg to make three original properties. It was conceived as soon as the original game was completed. Spielberg kept meeting with EA on Boom Blox on new ideas; producer Amir Rahimi commented that there was so much enthusiasm that "he could hardly stop them from doing a sequel." A feature which was cut in Boom Blox was not included in this game either. It was a head-tracking system, which would allow the player to use two Wii Remotes to control the game's camera with his or her head. Because the developers didn't receive the development hardware in time to implement it, Wii MotionPlus compatibility is not included. In an interview, it was stated that Steven Spielberg had sometimes expressed interest in making a Boom Blox movie, but an Electronic Arts spokesperson commented that this is all just brainstorming.

Reception

Bash Party has received generally favorable reviews from critics, holding an 86% on Metacritic. IGN awarded Bash Party an Editors' Choice award, giving it 8.5 out of 10. G4's X-Play gave it 5 out of 5 stars.

References

External links
 Official website

Steven Spielberg
Video game sequels
Electronic Arts games
Puzzle video games
Wii-only games
Wii Wi-Fi games
2009 video games
Multiplayer and single-player video games
Video games scored by Silas Hite
Video games developed in the United States